Bethel ( "House of God") is a biblical site.

Beth-El, Beth El or Beit El may refer to the following Jewish synagogues:

Canada
 Beth El Synagogue (Newfoundland)

China
 Beth El Synagogue (Shanghai)

Israel
 Beit El Kabbalist yeshiva

Morocco
 Temple Beth-El (Casablanca)

New Zealand
 Beth El Synagogue, Christchurch

United States
(by state then city)

Alabama
 Temple Beth-El (Anniston, Alabama)
 Temple Beth-El (Birmingham, Alabama)

Connecticut
 Beth El Synagogue (Waterbury, Connecticut)

Florida
 Temple Beth-El (Pensacola, Florida)

Illinois
 North Suburban Synagogue Beth El (Highland Park)

Maryland
 Congregation Beth El (Bethesda, Maryland)
 Beth El Congregation (Pikesville, Maryland)

Michigan
 Temple Beth El (Alpena, Michigan)
 Temple Beth El (Detroit)

Minnesota 
 Beth El Synagogue (St. Louis Park, Minnesota)

Missouri
 Temple Beth El (Jefferson City, Missouri)

New Jersey
 Temple Beth-El (Jersey City, New Jersey)
 Congregation Beth El (Voorhees, New Jersey)

New York
 Temple Beth-El (New York City)
 Beth El Jewish Center of Flatbush (Brooklyn, New York)
 Temple Beth El of Borough Park (Brooklyn, New York)
 Temple Beth-El (Great Neck, New York)
 Temple Beth-El (Hornell, New York)
 Temple Beth El of Northern Westchester (Chappaqua)
 Temple Beth El (Syracuse, New York)
 Temple Beth-El (Tonawanda, New York) (merged)

Rhode Island
 Temple Beth-El (Providence, Rhode Island)

Tennessee
 Anshei Sphard Beth El Emeth Congregation

Texas
 Temple Beth-El (Corsicana, Texas)
 Temple Beth-El (San Antonio)

Virginia
 Beth El Hebrew Congregation (Alexandria, Virginia)
 Temple Beth El (Suffolk, Virginia)

Wisconsin
 Temple Beth El (Madison, Wisconsin)

See also
 Bethel (disambiguation)
 Beit El Synagogue